Samuel Seghers (born 12 September 1994) is a Papua New Guinean swimmer. He made his major debut for Papua New Guinea at the 2015 Pacific Games and later traveled to Kazan, Russia for the 2015 World Aquatics Championships.

References
 

1994 births
Living people
Papua New Guinean male swimmers
Commonwealth Games competitors for Papua New Guinea
Swimmers at the 2018 Commonwealth Games